John Lynch (August 28, 1740 – October 31, 1820) was an American merchant who founded the city of Lynchburg, Virginia.

Early life
Lynch's father was Charles Lynch, who was born in Galway, Ireland, but immigrated to Virginia in 1720 and prospered. Lynch himself was born on August 28, 1740, in Albemarle County, Virginia. Charles Lynch married Sarah Clarke in 1733 and moved near the present site of Lynchburg. John Lynch was one of six children they had, another of whom was Charles, a judge believed to be the namesake of lynching.

Founding of Lynchburg
The Lynch Ferry across the James River was established by the family about 1745. In 1757, seventeen year old John Lynch took over control of the ferry business. Years later, first in 1784 and again in 1786, Lynch petitioned the General Assembly of Virginia for a charter to establish a town on the bluffs above the ferry upon land Lynch had inherited from an older brother. The 1786 petition was granted and the town of Lynchburg was founded.

Lynch freed his own slaves during his lifetime and consistently supported the antislavery movement.

References

Sources
 
 
 
 

Lynchburg, Virginia
1740 births
1820 deaths
American slave owners
American city founders
American people of Irish descent
People from Albemarle County, Virginia